Tsovagyugh is a village in the Sevan Municipality of the Gegharkunik Province of Armenia.

History 
The village contains church ruins, and upon an egg-shaped hill to the northeast are the remains of an Iron Age fort.

Gallery

References

External links 

 World Gazeteer: Armenia – World-Gazetteer.com
 
 

Populated places in Gegharkunik Province
Mountain resorts in Armenia